Gateshead Stadium is a Tyne and Wear Metro station, serving Gateshead International Stadium and the town of Gateshead in Tyne and Wear, England. It joined the network on 15 November 1981, following the opening of the third phase of the network, between Haymarket and Heworth.

History
The station was purpose-built for the network, and is named after the nearby Gateshead International Stadium. During the planning phase, the station was intended to be named Old Fold, after a neighbouring residential area.

Facilities
The station has two platforms, both of which have seating, next train audio and visual displays, timetable and information posters and an emergency help point. Additional facilities are available on the concourse, as well as ticket machines (which accept cash, card and contactless payment) and smartcard validators. There is step-free access to the island platform by ramp, with platforms also accessed by staircase. There is cycle storage at the station, with two cycle pods.

Refurbishment
In 2015, the station was refurbished, along with nearby Felling. Improvements include the installation of new seating and lighting, dual handrails, tactile paving, anti-slip surfacing on stairs and platform nosing and colour variation of floor. The station was also rebranded in the new black and white corporate colour scheme.

Services 

Rolling stock used: Class 599 Metrocar

Notes

References

External links
 
 Timetable and station information for Gateshead Stadium

Railway stations in Great Britain opened in 1981
Tyne and Wear Metro Green line stations
Tyne and Wear Metro Yellow line stations